Çevreli can refer to:

 Çevreli, Alaca
 Çevreli, Kastamonu
 Çevreli, Mudurnu
 Çevreli, Tarsus
 Çevreli, Yusufeli